"A Broken Wing" is a song written by James House, Sam Hogin and Phil Barnhart, and recorded by American country music singer Martina McBride.  It was released in September 1997 as the second single from McBride's album Evolution. In January 1998, "A Broken Wing" became McBride's second Number One single.

Background
Written and originally performed in key of B major with a vocal range of two octaves from E3 to E5, "A Broken Wing" has a  time signature. The verses use a chord progression of I–ii–IV–I three times, followed by I–ii7–IV–V–I; the refrain uses vi–iii7–ii7–I followed by I–ii7–IV–V–I. Instrumentally, McBride's 1998 version features acoustic guitar, electric guitar, pedal steel guitar, piano, bass guitar and drums.

Content
In the song, the narrator recounts a young woman escaping from an emotionally abusive relationship. Regarding the second verse, wherein the husband finds "a note by the window / and the curtains blowin' in the breeze," the authors of the book My Country Roots wrote the song's conclusion could be interpreted to indicate the woman either escaped or committed suicide.

Producer Paul Worley told Billboard magazine in 1998 the track, except for the backing vocals, was recorded in one day, while other tracks on the album were recorded in pieces over time.

Music video
The music video was directed by Robert Deaton III and George Flanigen IV, also collectively known as Deaton-Flanigen Productions. The video features McBride singing the song at the Croft House in the Nashville Zoo at Grassmere. Interspersed throughout the clip is a woman locked in an abusive relationship with her husband. While making dinner, the husband complains about the salad she made for him. Later, when the woman is on the phone, her husband interrupts the call. Eventually, the wife gets up out of the bed and the husband goes upstairs, only to find a note left by the disappeared wife.

It was nominated for Music Video of the Year at the 1998 Country Music Association awards.

Personnel

 Bob Bailey – backing vocals
 Joe Chemay – bass guitar
 Dan Dugmore – pedal steel guitar
 Kim Fleming – backing vocals
 Vicki Hampton – backing vocals
 Dann Huff – electric guitar
 Martina McBride – lead and backing vocals, tambourine
 Biff Watson – acoustic guitar
 Billy Joe Walker Jr. – acoustic guitar
 Lonnie Wilson – drums

Other versions
Jordin Sparks covered the song on her 2007 EP Jordin Sparks. Her version of the song made number 66 on the Billboard Hot 100.

Chart positions
"A Broken Wing" debuted on the Hot Country Singles & Tracks (now Hot Country Songs) charts dated for September 13, 1997. The song spent twenty-five weeks on that chart, peaking at number one on the charts dated for January 10, 1998.

Year-end charts

Certifications

References

1997 singles
Martina McBride songs
Music videos directed by Deaton-Flanigen Productions
Songs written by James House (singer)
Song recordings produced by Paul Worley
RCA Records Nashville singles
Songs written by Sam Hogin
Songs written by Phil Barnhart (songwriter)
1997 songs
Songs about domestic violence
Songs about suicide